Aspergillus australensis is a species of fungus in the genus Aspergillus. It is from the Fumigati section. The species was first described in 2007. Aspergillus australensis produces aszonalenins and wortmannins.

Growth and morphology

A. australensis has been cultivated on both Czapek yeast extract agar (CYA) plates and Malt Extract Agar Oxoid® (MEAOX) plates. The growth morphology of the colonies can be seen in the pictures below.

References

Further reading
 
 

australensis
Fungi described in 2011